Carlos Anwandter (1 April 1801, in Luckenwalde, Prussia – 10 July 1889, in Valdivia, Chile) was a German political exile who emigrated to Valdivia, Chile in 1850 after participating in the Revolutions of 1848.

Biography 

He migrated to Valdivia in 1850, the leader of the first contingent of German colonists sent by Philippi. In 1851 founded the Anwandter brewery  in Isla Teja. Among other things in Valdivia founded the first volunteer fire company "Germania" (1 March 1852), the German Club (1853) and the German School (1858) which now bears his name (German Institute Carlos Anwandter), being its first Director.

Famous quotes 
As representative of the German immigrants to Chile he swore:

"We will be as honest and laborious Chileans as the best of them. We will defend our adoptive country joining in the ranks of our new countrymen against any foreign oppression with the resolve and strength of the man who defends his fatherland, his family and his interests. Never will the country that adopts us as her children, reason to repent of this enlightened, human and generous deed."

Legacy
Instituto Alemán Carlos Anwandter, Valdivia's German School,  is named after him.

See also
German colonization of Valdivia, Osorno and Llanquihue

References 

1801 births
1889 deaths
People from Luckenwalde
People from Los Ríos Region
German emigrants to Chile
Member of the Prussian National Assembly